Myoporum wilderi, commonly known as Cook Islands myoporum or ngaio,  is a plant in the figwort family, Scrophulariaceae and is endemic to the islands of Mangaia and Mitiaro in the Cook Islands. It is similar to Myoporum stokesii and Myoporum rimatarense which grow on other Pacific Islands. On the island of Raratonga it is used to add a scent to coconut oil.

Description
They are the same shiny colour on both surfaces, glabrous and have a distinct mid-vein.

The tube is white with distinct purple spots in the tube and on the inner parts of the lobes. There are four stamens which extend beyond the petal tube. The fruits is an oval shaped drupe with a distinct point on the end.

Taxonomy
Myoporum wilderi was first formally described in 1933 by Carl Skottsberg and the description was published in Acta Horti Gothoburgensis. The specific epithet  wilderi honours the botanist Gerrit Parmile Wilder.

Distribution and habitat
Myoporum wilderi is only found on Mangaia and Mitiaro.

Uses
On Mangaia, the flowers of this myoporum are used to scent coconut oil. On Raratonga, the species is cultivated for the same purpose.

References

Endemic flora of the Cook Islands
Flora of the Cook Islands
wilderi
Plants described in 1933